Hamburg-Mitte is an electoral constituency (German: Wahlkreis) represented in the Bundestag. It elects one member via first-past-the-post voting. Under the current constituency numbering system, it is designated as constituency 18. It is located in central Hamburg, comprising the Hamburg-Mitte borough and southern parts of the Hamburg-Nord borough.

Hamburg-Mitte was created for the 1965 federal election. Since 2021, it has been represented by Falko Droßmann of the Social Democratic Party (SPD).

Geography
Hamburg-Mitte is located in central Hamburg. As of the 2021 federal election, it comprises all of the Hamburg-Mitte borough with the exception of the quarter of Wilhelmsburg, as well as the quarters of Barmbek-Nord, Barmbek-Süd, Dulsberg, Hohenfelde, and Uhlenhorst from the Hamburg-Nord borough.

History
Hamburg-Mitte was created in 1965 and contained parts of the abolished constituencies of Hamburg I, Hamburg VI and Hamburg VII. Until 1998, it had the constituency 12 in the numbering system. Originally, it comprised the Hamburg-Mitte borough with the exception of the quarters of Horn, Billstedt, and Billbrook; it included the quarters of Altona-Altstadt and Altona-Nord/Süd from the Altona borough.

In the 1976 election, the quarter of Eilbek from the Wandsbek borough was added. From the 1980 election through the 1998 election, the constituency comprised the entirety of Hamburg-Mitte without the quarters of Finkenwerder and Billstedt, plus the quarter of Barmbek-Uhlenhorst from the Hamburd-Nord borough. For the 2002 election, the constituency was reconfigured. It comprised the Hamburg-Mitte borough without Wilhelmsburg, as well as the quarters of Barmbek-Nord, Barmbek-Süd, Dulsberg, Hohenfelde, and Uhlenhorst from the Hamburg-Nord borough, and Eilbek from the Wandsbek borough. In the 2013 election, the new quarter of Sternschanze was transferred from Hamburg-Mitte to the Hamburg-Altona constituency. In the 2017 election, the quarter of Eilbek was transferred from Hamburg-Mitte to the Hamburg-Wandsbek constituency.

Members
The constituency has been held continuously by the Social Democratic Party (SPD) since its creation in 1965. Its first representative was Eugen Glombig, who served from 1965 to 1980, followed by Freimut Duve from 1980 to 1998. Johannes Kahrs was representative from 1998 to 2021. Falko Droßmann was elected in 2021.

Election results

2021 election

2017 election

2013 election

2009 election

References

Federal electoral districts in Hamburg
1965 establishments in Germany
Constituencies established in 1965